The Pancha Ishwarams (five abodes of Shiva) are five coastal ancient kovils (temples) built in dedication to the Hindu supreme being Ishwara in the form of the god Shiva, located along the circumference of Sri Lanka. 

The most sacred pilgrimage complexes for Sri Lankan Tamil devotees of Hinduism, they adhere to the ancient Saiva Siddhanta philosophy with central shrines for Shiva in each temple. Initial construction was by royal architects of the Naga kingdom (Nayanar). The Shiva lingams in each kovil are recorded as being Ravana's installations, while one of his descendants, the ancient Yaksha queen Kuveni was a devotee of Ishwara. Eventually, the kovils became international focal points of their classical era capitals in their respective districts, maintaining their own historical records, traditions and broad influence across Asia. Figures such as Agastya, Rama, Ravana and Arjuna - featured with the temples in Sthala Puranas, local Maanmiyams, Mahabharata and Ramayana -  are displayed at these shrines, although recent research points to the temples' pre-Vedic origins, built to protect devotees from natural disasters. 

Developed through the patronage of Ceylonese residents, Sri Lankan and Indian royals during the Nayanar-Anuraigraamam Tamraparniyan floruit, pilgrims of other dharmic schools are noted to have worshipped and made donations for their upkeep - thus Buddhist and Jain elements are also within the complexes. The Pancha Ishwarams were looted and destroyed during the Portuguese colonial period in Sri Lanka, and extensive ruins of primarily Pallava construction were unearthed up until the 21st century. Most of the temples have since been restored. Their complexes retain elaborate sandstone lintels and pediments, intricate black granite carvings, tall gopurams, and stone iconography. Foundational steles remain and contain inscriptions. Bathing ponds and lake tanks constructed by the same Nayanar engineers to cultivate agriculture and irrigation are a typical feature.

The Athenaeum published that a research drive was underway in 1832 into the ancient sciences, literature, fine arts customs and city governance of the Pancha Ishwarams. The scholar and historian, Dr. Paul E. Pieris declared in 1917, at a meeting of the Royal Asiatic Society (Ceylon Branch), that:

List of the Pancha Ishwarams

Popular culture
The temples have hosted several music, dance and dramatic performances, including a well received performance from the celebrated Carnatic vocalist Nageswari Brahmananda at Thiru Ketheeswaram. The Bharathanatyam dance drama musical "Pancha Ishwarams of Lanka" was debuted at Logan Hall, University of London in October 1999 as the second of a two-part concert. The production brought narratives of all five temples to the stage, as researched at the time by the historian S. Arumugam and professor K. Kailasanatha Kurukkal who presented the concert. Commissioned by the Shruthi Laya Shangam after the unearthing of the stone Nandi and lingam of the Tenavaram complex, its music and lyrics were composed by the Carnatic violinist Lalgudi Jayaraman, written by Jayaraman and Professor Va Ve Subramaniam, and choreographed by Vijayalakshmi Krishnaswamy. The production was performed by Jayaraman on the violin alongside his disciples Dr. Lakshmi Jayan, S. P. Ramh singing, Pavithra Mahesh on veena as well as Jagdeesan on mridangam, and dancers of the Kalakshetra school, Chennai and London. It was critically acclaimed and a huge audience favourite. Jayaraman interacted with the audience following the production, most of whom were expatriate Sri Lankan Tamils of the diaspora.

Related temples
Two other shore Shiva temples of ancient Sri Lanka rank in high sanctity alongside the Pancha Ishwarams. The Rameswaram Ramanathaswamy Kovil of Ramanathapuram district, linked to Koneswaram and Tenavaram, connected to  Kalinga Magha and expanded by Jaffna kings  Jeyaveera Cinkaiariyan and Gunaveera Cinkaiariyan is now part of Tamil Nadu, India but formerly under Jaffna sovereignty. The Taantondreswaram temple of Kokkadichcholai, Batticaloa district was consecrated by Kalinga Magha and is also mentioned in the Mattakallappu Manmiyam.

See also
List of Hindu temples in Sri Lanka

References

Hindu pilgrimage sites in Sri Lanka
Hindu temples in Sri Lanka
Shiva temples